The Citadel Bulldogs baseball program is a college baseball team that represents The Citadel, The Military College of South Carolina in the Southern Conference.  The Bulldogs compete in the National Collegiate Athletic Association (NCAA) Division I.

The Citadel did not begin keeping complete records for its baseball program until 1954, after seven schools left the SoCon to form the Atlantic Coast Conference. Known records for full seasons are listed below.  Partial season records are not included.

There have been 27 head baseball coaches at The Citadel, many of whom also coached football and/or basketball. Of coaches with known records, Fred Jordan has won the most games with 831. "Rip" Simpson recorded the highest winning percentage, at .833 in 1908.  Of coaches with more than one season at the helm, Mack Erwin's .672 winning percentage is the highest. Chal Port coached for 27 seasons, the longest of any coach.

Key

Coaches

Notes

References

Lists of college baseball head coaches in the United States

Citadel Bulldogs baseball coaches